Luis Antonio Brunetto (October 27, 1901 – May 7, 1968) was an Argentine athlete who competed mainly in the triple jump. He competed for Argentina in the 1924 Summer Olympics held in Paris, France, in the triple jump where he won the silver medal.

References

External links
 

1901 births
1968 deaths
Argentine people of Italian descent
Argentine male triple jumpers
Olympic silver medalists for Argentina
Athletes (track and field) at the 1924 Summer Olympics
Olympic athletes of Argentina
Sportspeople from Rosario, Santa Fe
Medalists at the 1924 Summer Olympics
Olympic silver medalists in athletics (track and field)